Irene Wan Bik-ha (born Wen Bik-ha on 30 July 1966) is a Hong Kong actress, singer and producer. Her father was an officer of the Republic of China Army. In her early years, she was known as a "sexy beauty". After her marriage, Wan faded out of the entertainment industry and occasionally participated in dramas and films. She is currently based in mainland China.

Early life and career
She was born and lived in District 8 of Rennie's Mill squatter district in the New Territories of Hong Kon. She is the youngest of four brothers and three sisters. Growing up her family was poor. Her father had been an officer of the Republic of China (Kuomintang) Army and settled in Hong Kong after fleeing Mainland of China. The artist Chen Yulian was her next door neighbor, and Wang Xiaofeng was also the neighbor below her residence. When Irene Wan was a child, she often played with boys in the same district, mainly playing table tennis and badminton with them. She once attended Mingyuan Primary School and enjoys music and fine arts. Later, in order to want her to enroll in a better secondary school, her mother arranged for her to continue her studies in a secondary school on Hong Kong Island .

After completing the first grade at Catholic Mingyuan Middle School, Irene Wan went to the former St. John's College for Co-Education in Tai Koo Shing. During the latter's schooling period, she was a member of the school's basketball team . She moved to Shau Kei Wan to live with her sister in order to facilitate schooling when she was 12 years old. She was sold by her mother because of her poverty. Because of his father's strict discipline, she developed a rebellious character. "When I was in middle school, I learned to smoke, go to the dance hall (P field) and make friends with problem teenagers". Later, when she was 15 years old (1983), she was discovered by scouts on the street to participate in the filming of the movie "Lonely Fifteen" and joined the entertainment circle. She had not graduated from high school at the time .

She was nominated for the Hong Kong Film Award for Best New Performer at the 2nd Hong Kong Film Awards for her role in Lonely Fifteen.

She gained notice for her beauty and remarkable performance in Everlasting Love (1984), co-starring with Andy Lau and Loletta Lee, when she was only 17 years old. Later, she also gave impressive performances in Stanley Kwan's Love Unto Waste (1986) and Rouge (1988).

However, in the 1990s, her film career sputtered when she agreed to star in All of a Sudden (1996), which would be her first and only time appearing fully nude in a film. Wan later went on to star in several TVB television series.

In 2019, at the age of 53, Wan drew controversy for her suggestive scenes with two younger actors in the thriller The Fallen (the male actor being 14-year-old younger than Wan and the female actress 27 younger). Her performance in the film would later eventually won her the Best Actress in a Leading Role award at the 8th Silk Road International Film Festival in 2020.

Personal life
Wan married Kenneth Ho, a wealthy Hong Kong businessman, on 1 October 2000. Their wedding was held at Banyan Tree Hotel in Phuket, Thailand. Ho is the grandnephew of the Kuomintang veteran He Yingqin and worked at Solomon Brothers Hong Kong Asia Pacific Investment as the Vice President of the Banking Department. The two have never planned to have children. Until 2010, Wan and her husband adopted an orphan who was abandoned in a train station in Mainland China. They also sought a doctor to cure his skin disease and cough, and renamed the child to Xavier Ho (何國倫).

Filmography
Lonely Fifteen (靚妹仔) (1982) (Hong Kong) – Irene/Xia Nu
Happy Sixteen (俏皮女学生) (1982) (Hong Kong) – Da Yan Zi 
Possessed (猛鬼出籠) (1983) (Hong Kong) – Irene (Hsiao's Sister)
101 Citizen Arrest (101拘捕令) (1983 – 1984, TV Series) (Hong Kong) – Irene
Pom Pom (神勇雙響炮) (1984) (Hong Kong) – Koo's Prostitute 
Everlasting Love(停不了的爱) (1984) (Hong Kong) – Liang Peijun 
Lucky Stars Go Places (最佳福星) (1986) (Hong Kong) – Lady Officer 
Love Unto Waste (地下情) (1986) (Hong Kong) – Ruan Bei Er 
Caper (警贼兄弟) (1986) (Hong Kong) – Annie San Fun 
Rouge (胭脂扣) (1988) (Hong Kong) – Cheng Shuxian 
Lai Shi, China's Last Eunuch (中國最後一個太監) (1988) (Hong Kong) – Zhao Di 
Tiger Cage (特警屠龙) (1988) (Hong Kong) – A Mei 
Ruthless Law (法律无情) (1988) (Hong Kong) – Huang Peiyan
Bloody Brotherhood (同根生) (1989) (Hong Kong) – He Jiao (Jiahua's wife)
The Wild Ones (我未成年) (1989) (Hong Kong) – Chen Yuqin 
Hearts, No Flowers (少女心) (1989) (Hong Kong) – Li Xiangyun
Armageddon (城市判官) (1989) (Hong Kong) – Yang Min
Running Mate (追女重案组) (1989) (Hong Kong) – Lin Luoxin 
Fatal Vacation (安乐战场) (1990) (Hong Kong) – Candy 
The Sniping (奇兵) (1990) (Hong Kong) – Elaine 
The Fugitives (末路狂奔) (1991, TV Series) (Hong Kong) – Huang Xiaoying 
Touch and Go (一触即发) (1991) (Hong Kong) – May 
The Tigers (五虎将之决裂) (1991) (Hong Kong) – Shirley Lam 
Heartbreak Blues (與郎共舞) (1991, TV Series) (Hong Kong) – Jiang Qingzhao 
In The Lap of God (蛮荒的童话) (1991) (Hong Kong) – May Tse 
Now You See Love, Now You Don't (我爱扭纹柴) (1992) (Hong Kong) – Canoe Girl
Vengeance (火玫瑰) (1992, TV Series) (Hong Kong) – Haichao
The Knight and the Concubine (唐朝妖姬) (1992, TV Series) (Hong Kong) – Dong Er
Twilight of the Forbidden City (告別紫禁城) (1992) (Hong Kong) – Zhao Di
Class of '93 (爱生事家庭) (1992 – 1993, TV Series) (Hong Kong) – Liang Huan
Just Gold Modern Woman (鎮金女人週記：三職新女性) (1993, TV Series) (Hong Kong) – Joanne (appears in episode 8)
Man of the Times (一代梟雄: 三支旗) (1993) (Hong Kong) – Guo Qiuju
Labor revenge (1993) (Hong Kong)
Mr. Sardine (沙甸鱼杀人事件) (1994) (Hong Kong) – Bei An Na
Circus Kids (马戏小子) (1994) (Hong Kong) – Xiao Lan
Gentle Reflections (恨锁金瓶) (1994, TV Series) (Hong Kong) – Pan Jinlian
Just Gold Modern Woman II (鎮金女人週記（第二輯）：告別霓虹) (1994, TV Series) (Hong Kong) – Mo Qiqi (Vicky) (appears in episode 5)
The Flame and the Fiancee (倒數七日情) (1995) (Hong Kong) – Cat
Justice Pao (包青天) (1995 – 1996, TV Series) (Hong Kong) – Zi Tong/Tong Fei (appears from episode 71 to episode 75)
All of a Sudden (惊变) (1996) (Hong Kong) – Miao Ke Yi/Lam Ho Yee
Take to Probity (反貪風暴) (1997, TV Series) (China) – Bai Xue
Shigong Qi An Danyuan Ju III (施公奇案單元劇：血手印) (1997, TV Series) (Taiwan) – Qin Meiniang (appears from episode 13 to episode 19)
Against the Blade of Honour (圓月彎刀) (1997, TV Series) (Hong Kong) – Qin Keqing
Shigong Qi An Danyuan Ju XXVII (施公奇案單元劇：審妻記) (1997, TV Series) (Taiwan) – Li Huiniang (appears from episode 146 to episode 150)
Shigong Qi An Danyuan Ju XLIV (施公奇案單元劇：犬父龍子) (1998, TV Series) (Taiwan) – Xie Xuezhen (appears from episode 263 to episode 272)
Burning Harbor (燃烧的港湾) (1998) (Hong Kong) – Xu Meili
The End of Love Generation (恋恋琼瑶) (1999) (Hong Kong)
Scary Scorpse (屍前想後) (2000) (Hong Kong) – Wen Wen
Tequila Sunrise (火龍女) (2001) (Hong Kong) – Coco
Kang San Lau (江山楼) (2001, TV Series) (Taiwan) – Jin Bao/A Chun/Yan Chun 
Gods of Honour (封神榜) (2001, TV Series) (Hong Kong) – Su Daji
A Tragic Room (斗室96小時) (2003) (Hong Kong) – Luo Ping
Di xie Wenshen (滴血纹身) (2003, TV Series) (China) – Ouyang Yiyun
The Happiness of Family Reunion (2004) (Hong Kong) – Jiang Wan Shu
Magic Needle (幻影神針) (2005, TV Series) (China) – Liu Langyue
The Spirit of Nu River (怒江魂) (2005) (China) – Na Shan
Records of Kangxi's Travel Incognito season 5 (康熙微服私访记5) (2006, TV Series) (China) - Concubine Yi (Yi Fei - Yi Feng Er)
Exodus (出埃及記) (2007) (Hong Kong) – Pan Xiaoyuan 
The Drunkard (2010) – Mrs. Wong
The Loan Shark (2011)
72 Heroes (2011)
Triad (2012) – Irene
Impetuous Love in Action (2014) – Irene
Love in Late Autumn (2016) – Linda Wen
708090 (2016) – Zhao Yuan Yuan
Across The Ocean To See You (2017) – Melinda Zheng
Guardian Angel 2018 Web Drama (2018) – Sister Mi (appears in episode 14–16) 
The Fallen (2019) – Fu Yu Yu
My Dear Destiny (2020, TV Series)

Discography

Studio albums

Singles
1994：《一醉化千愁》(Theme song of TVB TV series "Gentle Reflections")
2020：《Make You Smile》

Concerts
19 June 2018：《Irene Wan Haichao Concert2018》

Song scores

Awards and nominations

Hong Kong Film Awards

Macau International Film Festival

Silk Road International Film Festival

Annotation

References

External links

HK cinemagic entry
loveHKfilm entry

1966 births
Living people
Hong Kong Buddhists
Hong Kong film actresses
Hong Kong television actresses
People from Zhaoqing
TVB actors
20th-century Hong Kong actresses
21st-century Hong Kong actresses